tRNA (cytosine-5-)-methyltransferase is an enzyme that in humans is encoded by the TRDMT1 gene.

CpG methylation is an epigenetic modification that is important for embryonic development, imprinting, and X-chromosome inactivation. Studies in mice have demonstrated that DNA methylation is required for mammalian development. This gene encodes a protein with similarity to DNA methyltransferases, but this protein does not display methyltransferase activity. The protein strongly binds DNA, suggesting that it may mark specific sequences in the genome. Alternative splicing results in multiple transcript variants encoding different isoforms.

It has been shown that human DNMT2 does not methylate DNA but instead methylates cytosine 38 in the anticodon loop of aspartic acid transfer RNA (tRNA(Asp)).

References

Further reading